The Simpson Memorial United Methodist Church is a historic United Methodist church located at Greenville, Floyd County, Indiana.   It was designed by church plan catalogue architect Benjamin D. Price and built by Capt. John Nafius in 1899.  It is a frame Gothic Revival style church built on the Akron Plan and topped by a hipped and gable roof. It features lancet windows and a corner bell tower topped with four square piers sheathed in tin.

It was listed on the National Register of Historic Places in 2004.

References

External links
2010 photograph of Simpson Memorial United Methodist Church on flickr

Churches on the National Register of Historic Places in Indiana
Gothic Revival church buildings in Indiana
Churches completed in 1899
Buildings and structures in Floyd County, Indiana
Methodist churches in Indiana
Akron Plan church buildings
National Register of Historic Places in Floyd County, Indiana